John Grosvenor Rowland (born May 24, 1957) is an American politician, author, and convicted felon who served as the 86th Governor of Connecticut from 1995 to 2004. He served two nonconsecutive prison terms on various corruption charges.  A Republican, Rowland previously served in the United States House of Representatives from 1985 to 1991, representing the state's 5th district. In 2004, Rowland resigned from office during a corruption investigation, and later pleaded guilty in federal court to a one-count indictment for conspiracy to commit honest services fraud, mail fraud and tax fraud. He was the first Connecticut governor to be elected to three terms since 1784. Wilbur Cross was elected to four consecutive terms in the 1930s. 

Rowland served ten months in a federal prison until February 10, 2006, followed by four months' house arrest at his home in West Hartford, Connecticut, until June 2006. His lieutenant governor, Jodi Rell, replaced him as governor.

On April 10, 2014, Rowland was indicted on seven counts for his role in an election fraud case where former congressional candidate Lisa Wilson-Foley, current vice chair of the Bushnell Center for the Performing Arts and her husband, Brian Foley, pleaded guilty in federal court on March 31, 2014, to illegally paying Rowland $35,000 in campaign consulting fees. He was charged with two counts of falsifying records in a federal investigation, one count of conspiracy, two counts of causing false statements to be made to the FEC, and two counts of causing illegal campaign contributions. He was convicted on all seven counts in September 2014, and was subsequently sentenced to 30 months in prison on March 18, 2015.

He is married to Patty Rowland, his second wife, and the couple has five children between them.

Early political career

Rowland's political career began in 1980 when, at age 23, he was elected to the Connecticut State House of Representatives. He held his seat until 1984, when he was elected to represent Connecticut's 5th congressional district in the United States House of Representatives and was reelected in 1986 and 1988.

Consulting career 
After losing the 1990 gubernatorial race to Lowell P. Weicker Jr., Rowland worked as a consultant for United Technologies Corp.

Tenure as Governor

Rowland was later elected governor in 1994 at age 37 (the youngest governor in Connecticut history) and later defeated two Democratic opponents: former US Congresswoman Barbara Bailey Kennelly (63%–35%) in 1998 and former State Comptroller Bill Curry (56%–44%) in 2002.

The Adriaen's Landing project, the most ambitious capital city development project in decades in the state, continued to progress during Rowland's time in office. On Rowland's watch the state paid $37 million to TBI Construction to relocate Connecticut Natural Gas headquarters to East Hartford to make room for the development, TBI would later be at the center of the scandal that brought the Governor down.

In 1997 Rowland was the subject of the Geargate political scandal.  Surplus military equipment intended for the Connecticut State Police was diverted by Rowland and close associates for their personal use. Equipment and apparel including sleeping bags, camouflage jackets, helmets, and a bayonet made their way into the hands of Rowland's children, his staff, his security detail, and the husband of then Lt. Gov. Jodi Rell. The diversion was organized by corrupt State Trooper Eugene D’Angelo and was uncovered through a joint State Police and Department of Defense investigation.

In 1998, Rowland implemented the HUSKY Plan (Healthcare for UninSured Kids and Youth) to provide health insurance to uninsured Connecticut children. During his tenure, the budget for the Department of Children and Families more than doubled. Rowland supported addition to government of the state's first Child Advocate.

Rowland was a strong proponent of a tough stance against violent crime as governor. The prison population grew rapidly during his term, which caused the state to send inmates to prisons in Virginia to deal with overcrowding. Legislative opponents of this policy such as Representative Michael Lawlor urged more rapid release of nonviolent offenders. After Rowland left office the Virginia inmates were returned to Connecticut and more criminals were paroled. This approach was criticized after the 2007 Cheshire home invasion murders committed by two "nonviolent" inmates paroled from Connecticut prison.

In early 1998, Rowland outlined plans to make Hartford an educational, cultural, and entertainment center. He outlined a "Six Pillars of Progress" initiative which included the construction of a convention center, a higher education center, parking garages, housing, riverfront redevelopment, and the renovation of the Hartford Civic Center. By May 1998, the Connecticut General Assembly had authorized an initial $300 million to implement his urban renewal plan. Rowland established the Capital City Economic Development Authority, a quasi-state entity to oversee the implementation of his plan. Projects completed under this plan included the construction of Adriaen's Landing and other work on improving the riverfront, renovation of the former G. Fox & Co. department store so that it could house the new location of Capital Community College, and the Connecticut Convention Center.

In 2002 Lawrence Alibozek, former deputy chief of staff to the Governor, pleaded guilty to steering State contracts to the Tomasso Group, a contractor heavily involved with Rowland and his campaigns. The Tomasso Group's relationship with Rowland included more than $500,000 in legal campaign contributions as well as hosting the Governor's birthday at their Tunxis Country Club.

In 2003 Governor Rowland dismissed 2,800 state workers thus violating their union contracts. The 2nd U.S. Circuit Court of Appeals in New York City ruled in 2013 that the former Republican governor's administration had violated the workers right to freedom of association. Many workers were eventually rehired or otherwise partially compensated. "They lost benefits, they lost pension, they lost health insurance," creating "real interference" with people's lives, said Union Attorney David Golub.

Before investigation into his conduct as governor started, Rowland was viewed as a rising star in the Republican Party, and was mentioned as a future presidential or vice-presidential candidate.

Rowland resigned abruptly as governor, July 13, 2004, as he faced impeachment and investigation for corruption. Lieutenant Governor M. Jodi Rell served out the remainder of his term. Rowland is the first Connecticut governor to have ever faced impeachment and he is the only Connecticut governor to have served prison time.

Corruption as governor

Resignation amid the threat of impeachment
In the first year of Rowland's third term (2003), rumors began circulating that contractors doing business with the state, primarily the Tomasso Group, paid for and made improvements to his private weekend home. Rowland initially denied the allegations, but in December 2003, he abruptly appeared on television and admitted that work had been done by contractors on his vacation home at no charge, and that his earlier statements to the contrary were untrue. He claimed that, since the work was done, he had paid the contractors in full; but in January 2004 an official investigation began into charges of corruption and whether he should face impeachment.

On June 18, the Connecticut Supreme Court required Rowland to appear before the investigative panel seeking his testimony, which could have resulted in him giving evidence against impeachment in the ongoing criminal investigation. On June 21, Rowland resigned, effective noon on July 1, 2004, amid a strong likelihood impeachment.

Patty Rowland's poem 
Matters were exacerbated when the First Lady of Connecticut, Patty Rowland, wrote a satirical poem deriding the media for investigating her husband's wrongdoing. The poem, a parody of the classic A Visit From St. Nicholas, was read by the First Lady at the Middlesex Chamber of Commerce on Dec. 17, 2003.  The poem was published in its entirety in the New York Times the following day.

Conviction
On December 23, 2004, Rowland pleaded guilty to depriving the public of honest service. Rowland was sentenced on March 18, 2005, in New Haven, Connecticut, to one year and one day in prison, four months' house arrest, three years' probation and community service. On April 1, 2005, he entered Federal Correctional Institution, Loretto, in Pennsylvania. His federal inmate number was 15623-014.

After release
On February 10, 2006, Rowland was released from federal prison with the stipulation that he serve four months' house arrest with an electronic ankle bracelet monitor.

On July 1, 2006, Rowland spoke to an association of scholar athletes in Kingston, Rhode Island, about the lessons he learned.
A "sense of entitlement" and the "arrogance of power" were two of the biggest things that ended his political career, The Hartford Courant quoted him as saying.

He warned that the arrogance is very easy when you're put on a pedestal, and you "start to believe your own press releases. ... It [becomes] all about me. You start to block out what else is around you."

The Courant quoted Rowland as saying that "when you start to find yourself only concerned with yourself" that's the point when you need to find a "grounding force." That should be faith, ideally, he said, or at least "something within yourself"—not just other people.

"I found in my career that a lot of people will tell you how great you are—especially when you're the boss. But there will be that time when that career will be over ... and then it's down to the three F's—faith, family and friendsreal faith, real family and real friends."

Rowland, now a resident of West Hartford, told the audience his future is still uncertain. He owes the Internal Revenue Service more than $35,000 and another $40,000 in fines. He said he's a volunteer counselor and hoping to find a publisher for a book he wrote called Falling Into Grace.

In September 2006, local TV station WTNH, reported that Patty Rowland had purchased a house in Middlebury, Connecticut, and the Rowland family would be moving to that town.

Rowland discussed his life after politics in a Washington Post article published June 17, 2007. Rowland discussed his work on the lecture circuit and the factors leading to his political demise. He also expressed disappointment that his successor, Governor M. Jodi Rell, had "thrown him under the bus" and distanced herself from him after taking office. Rell declined to criticize Rowland over these remarks.

In January 2008, Waterbury Republican Mayor Michael Jarjura announced that he would hire Rowland as an economic development advisor for the city. Rowland began work in February and received an annual salary of $95,000 as the city's economic development coordinator. Rowland's stint as Waterbury's economic development coordinator ended in 2012.

Radio show
From 2010 until 2014, Rowland hosted the afternoon show on Hartford's WTIC (1080).

On April 1, 2014, Connecticut governor Dannel P. Malloy called on WTIC to remove Rowland from the air due to Rowland's implication in a corruption scandal involving former Congressional candidate Lisa Wilson-Foley. Malloy stated: "The reality is that we now know enough—two people have pled guilty to this charge and have identified the party they were engaged with ... unless there's going to be a denial and in light of two actual pleas, both identifying who the third party was, I think any reasonable outlet would remove him at this point […] He had the interesting position of trying to impact and influence political discourse on an afternoon radio show. That somebody would violate that trust as well, is disturbing." Rowland has often criticized Malloy since the latter took office in 2011. On one occasion, Rowland labeled Malloy a "pathological liar," although he later apologized to Malloy.

On April 3, 2014, just before 6 p.m. at the end of his regular three-hour time slot, Rowland announced that he was leaving as WTIC's afternoon talk-show host "to take care of some personal issues".

Wilson-Foley campaign 
On March 31, 2014, husband and wife Brian and Lisa Wilson-Foley, the Vice Chair of the Bushnell Center for the Performing Arts Board of Trustees, pleaded guilty in federal court to corruption charges for illegally paying and afterwards hiding campaign consulting fees to the former governor, who is widely considered the main target for the federal probers. In 2012, Wilson-Foley ran for Congress in Connecticut 5th district. Rowland secretly served as a consultant to her campaign.

On September 8, Lisa Wilson-Foley's husband, Brian Foley, told the jury that his wife had signed a fictional contract with Rowland to create the impression that Rowland was working for a group of nursing homes Foley owned. Instead, Rowland was providing political advice. Despite the statement, Rowland's lawyers insisted that the client was a campaign volunteer and that he was paid for giving Foley advice on his healthcare business, not for being a political consultant. Shortly thereafter on September 16, first defense witness Bedard testified in accord with this line of defense. Bedard claims directly countered prosecutor's charges whereby he states that Rowland: "The healthcare and nursing home industry was changing and Brian hired him as a consultant to help us move forward," Bedard testified: "The healthcare and nursing home industry was changing and Brian [Foley] hired him [Rowland] as a consultant to help us move forward. ... He knew the politics and practical ways to speed along Medicaid payments that were often delayed by between nine months to a year."

On September 19, 2014, Rowland was convicted on federal charges that he conspired to hide payment for his work on two congressional campaigns. He was convicted in New Haven federal court on all seven counts, including conspiracy, falsifying records in a federal investigation, causing false statements to be made to the Federal Election Commission, and causing illegal campaign contributions. On March 18, 2015, Rowland was sentenced to prison for 30 months by U.S. District Judge Janet Bond Arterton. Judge Arterton also fined Rowland $35,000 and ordered him to serve three years of supervision by the federal probation office upon his release. Rowland turned down the opportunity to speak and is planning on appealing the sentence. His conviction was upheld by the 2nd U.S. Circuit Court of Appeals in New York City on June 17, 2016. Rowland served less than the full 30-month term and was released from federal custody on May 26, 2018.

Electoral history

References

External links

 
 Patty Rowland reciting her 2003 poem on C-SPAN 

|-

|-

|-

|-

|-

|-

|-

1957 births
American people convicted of tax crimes
American people convicted of campaign finance violations
Connecticut politicians convicted of crimes
Republican Party governors of Connecticut
Living people
Republican Party members of the Connecticut House of Representatives
People from Middlebury, Connecticut
Politicians from Waterbury, Connecticut
Politicians convicted of honest services fraud
American politicians convicted of fraud
American politicians convicted of corruption
Politicians from Hartford, Connecticut
Republican Party members of the United States House of Representatives from Connecticut
Villanova University alumni
Writers from Waterbury, Connecticut
20th-century American politicians
21st-century American politicians